Thomas Henry Ismay (7 January 1837 – 23 November 1899) was the founder of the Oceanic Steam Navigation Company, more commonly known as the White Star Line. His son Joseph Bruce Ismay was managing director of the White Star Line and survived the maiden voyage of its ocean liner  in 1912.

Early years 
Thomas Ismay was born on 7 January 1837, in a small cottage in the town of Maryport, Cumberland. Some time after Thomas's birth, his father Joseph Ismay started a timber business, shipbrokers and shipbuilder. He bought shares in five vessels coming in and out of Maryport. When Thomas was six, the Ismays moved to a much larger house in Grasslot, Maryport. The entire family moved to the dwelling because of the three sisters Thomas's mother had. The home's name was "The Ropery", the name deriving from the ropes being used at the shipyard laid out in front of the home. This house was near his grandfather's shipyard. This was the first place where he was employed. He spent much of his time around the harbour. He learned here about the sea and navigation along with his most notable habit, of chewing tobacco, giving him the nickname "Baccy Ismay". When Thomas was 12 he was sent to High School in Brampton, Cumberland. This school was one of the best in all of Northern England. On 31 July 1855 his twin sister Charlotte died, aged 18.

South American voyage 
To gain some experience with ships, he arranged a trip to Chile on the S.V. Charles Jackson. She departed Liverpool on 4 January 1856, three days before Ismay's 19th birthday. They arrived on 8 April in Valparaiso, Chile, and stayed there until 30 May. During his stay he indulged in the local culture, visiting theatres, climbing mountains and dancing with the natives. He also noted that "Chilean women are said to be the best formed in the world." After his two-month stay, he took the steamer Bogota to Caldera, Chile, and after arriving there transferred to the SS Conrad. However, it being early morning, it was dark and when he jumped to the ship he missed and fell into the dock. Luckily, he remained conscious and grabbed hold of some wood attached to the pier. After coughing up seawater, he made a great deal of splashing to get help, as nobody had noticed him fall. He was eventually heard and rescued by rope; however, he lost his hat, broke his watch and ruined his notebook, cigar case and other things in his bag. At the end of the ten-day voyage, he took a train to Copiapo to meet up again with the Charles Jackson. The weather was horrible at the start, the ship lost some of her sails and split the topmast, and Ismay was badly hurt after a window smashed in and cut his toe. He arrived home in autumn 1856.

Shipping career 
At the age of 16, Ismay left school and started an apprentice with shipbrokers Imrie and Tomlinson of Liverpool. Upon completion of the apprenticeship, he wanted to gain some experience on the high seas. Once he got back to England he started a business. He partnered with Philip Nelson who was also a man from Maryport and a friend of his father. However, the partnership did not last long; Nelson was a retired sea captain and believed in old, trustworthy wooden ships while Ismay believed the future was in iron ships. In 1867 Ismay acquired the flag of the White Star Line.

Ismay had always held an interest in the Asiatic Steam Navigation Company and wanted to see how it was run, so he and Gustav Wolff, founder of Harland & Wolff, decided to take a trip to India on board an ASNC steamer. This was partly to see how their rival was managed and partly a family holiday. On 26 October 1887, they left Dawpool and travelled by train across Europe, seeing the sights of France, Switzerland and Italy along the way. In Egypt the pair visited the Pyramids and cruised on the Nile.

In 1873, SS Atlantic struck rocks and sank off the coast of Nova Scotia, Canada, killing at least 535 people. It was the greatest disaster for the White Star Line before the loss of the Titanic in 1912.

From 1863 till 1899, Ismay was president of White Star Line and had several ships under his authority. Most of these ships, until 1870, were chartered; even after 1870 most of White Star Line's vessels were chartered from more notable/wealthy shipping lines, so that the company could not be held completely responsible if someone died on board.

White Star Line vessels
Ulcoats, Cecelia, Golden Sunset, Gladiator, Duke of Edinburgh, Duleep Singh, Bucton Castle, Globe, Nereus, Borrowdale, Weathersfield, British Prince, Dallam Towers, Remington, Hecuba, Pride Of The Thames, Houghton Towers, Warwickshire, Victoria Tower, Hawarden Castle, Vancouver, Castlehead, Vandieman, Comandre, Seatoller, Casma, Compadre, Bayard, British Admiral, Montrose, Ismay, Estrella, Pembroke Castle, Hausquina, Rajah, Cairnsmore, Santon, Kirkwood, Delhi, Merwanjee Framjee, Cape Clear, Grace Gibson, Hannibal, Cardigan Castle, Santiago, Jason,  (Oceanic was White Star Line's first true vessel because she was actually ordered by Thomas Ismay)

Personal life 
On 7 April 1859, Ismay married Margaret, the daughter of Luke Bruce. In 1867, he acquired the flag and branding of the White Star Line. The family lived at Beach Lawn, Crosby.

During these years he undertook several grand projects including, in July 1882, the building of a private residence in Thurstaston on the Wirral Peninsula, designed by the renowned architect Richard Norman Shaw. Built of a local red sandstone, the property was completed in December 1884. It was named Dawpool and, when Ismay's widow died in 1907, both of his sons declined to take up residence. When the Ismays tried selling the house, the agent said the land would be worth more if the home was blown up and it was eventually sold to a Mr. Rutter who loaned it to the government as a hospital during World War I. In 1926 it was sold to Sir Henry Roberts who had it demolished a year later.

Death 
Shortly after the launching of the Oceanic on 14 January 1899, Ismay began to complain of pains in his chest. He had been very active throughout his life and was seldom sick, so his doctor took his pains very seriously. His condition slowly deteriorated and construction on Oceanics sister ships was delayed. In March of that year, Ismay's health began to improve, and he and Margaret went to Windermere where he became sick again. His wife summoned a doctor and a dose of morphine was given to Ismay. After six days he was feeling better and he returned to Dawpool in Thurstaston. Within six weeks he had more violent pain. The doctor diagnosed it as a gallstone. By 26 April, Ismay felt good enough to work, but in August he collapsed and was confined to bed. On 31 August an operation was performed to alleviate his condition. The operation was unsuccessful and a second became necessary on 4 September. The next morning he insisted that his daughters go on a voyage on the Oceanic whilst he talked to his wife. He asked his wife to arrange for the local church to pray for him. On 14 September Ismay suffered a heart attack. His condition continued to worsen, and, on 23 November 1899, he died at the age of 62. His wife never fully recovered, and she died seven years later.

He and his wife are commemorated with a large chest tomb at St Bartholomew's Church, Thurstaston, inscribed: "Great thoughts, great feelings came to him like instincts unawares" and "Blessed are the pure in heart for they shall see God." Ismay had been one of the patrons of the church, built in 1883–86 by J. L. Pearson.

References

 https://www.webcitation.org/query?url=http://www.geocities.com/ismayfamily/thismay.htm&date=2009-10-26+00:35:40 The Ismay Family. White Star Line. Thomas Henry Ismay.     The man and his background.
 Gardiner, Robin, History of the White Star Line, Ian Allan Publishing 2002. 
 Oldham, Wilton J. The Ismay Line: The White Star Line, and the Ismay family story, The Journal of Commerce, Liverpool, 1961
 "Ismay, Thomas Henry." Dictionary of National Biography (1901). Reproduced at Encyclopedia Titanica.
 "Thomas Henry Ismay Dead." The New York Times, 24 November 1899. Reproduced at Encyclopedia Titanica.

1837 births
1899 deaths
People from Maryport
British businesspeople in shipping
White Star Line
Businesspeople from Liverpool
19th-century English businesspeople